Marmoritis is a genus of plants in the Lamiaceae, first described in 1833. It is native to western China and the Himalayas.

Species
Marmoritis complanata (Dunn) A.L.Budantzev - Qinghai, Sichuan, Tibet, Yunnan
Marmoritis decolorans (Hemsl.) H.W.Li - Tibet, Nepal
Marmoritis nivalis (Benth.) Hedge - Tibet, Nepal, Himalayas of northern India
Marmoritis pharica (Prain) A.L.Budantzev - Tibet, Nepal
Marmoritis rotundifolia Benth - Tibet, Himalayas of northern India

References

Lamiaceae
Lamiaceae genera